Eremophila may refer to:

 Eremophila (bird), the horned larks
 Eremophila (plant), a plant genus of the family Scrophulariaceae